Qameshkan, also rendered as Qameshgan, may refer to:
 Qameshkan-e Olya
 Qameshkan-e Sofla